Nadejda may refer to:

Nadejda de Bragança or Prince Miguel, Duke of Viseu (1878–1923), member of the exiled branch of the House of Braganza
Nadejda Brânzan (1948–2020), infectious diseases physician from the Republic of Moldova
Nadejda of Bulgaria (1899–1958), member of the Bulgarian Royal Family
Nadejda Colesnicenco (born 1996), Moldovan footballer
Nadejda Danilina (born 1967), Soviet luger
Nadejda Dergachenko (born 1956), Ukrainian rower who represented the Soviet Union
Nadejda Dusanova (born 1987), Uzbekistani high jumper
Nadejda Grinfeld (1887–?) was a Bessarabian politician
Nadejda Guskova (born 1992), retired Russian tennis player, singer, philanthropist, journalist
Nadejda Mountbatten, Marchioness of Milford Haven (1917–1963), member of the Russian imperial family who became a British subject
Nadejda Ostrovskaya (born 1980), Belarusian former tennis player
Nadejda Palovandova (born 1975), Moldovan archer
Nadejda Popov (born 1994), Canadian rugby sevens player
Princess Nadejda Petrovna of Russia (1898–1988), the third child of Grand Duke Peter Nikolaevich of Russia and his wife
Nadejda Vasilică (born 1996), Moldovan footballer
Nadejda Waloff FRES (1909–2001), Russian-born English entomologist

See also
Nadezhda (given name)
Nadia